Diabetic dermopathy is a type of skin lesion usually seen in people with diabetes mellitus. It is characterized by dull-red papules that progress to well-circumscribed, small, round, atrophic hyperpigmented skin lesions usually on the shins. It is the most common of several diabetic skin conditions, being found in up to 30% of diabetics. Similar lesions can occasionally be found in non-diabetics usually following trauma or injury to the area; however, more than 4 lesions strongly suggests diabetes.

Cause 
The cause is unknown but is thought to be associated with diabetic neuropathy and vascular complications; because the lesions are more common on the shins, some suggest it represents an altered response to injury. It is seen more commonly in patients with longstanding diabetes and poor glucose control.

Diagnosis

Treatment
The disease can be controlled with blood glucose management and with the help of topical creams containing fusidic acid or a combination of fusidic acid with a corticosteroid such as betamethasone or hydrocortisone 1%

See also 
 Eruptive xanthoma
 List of cutaneous conditions
 Diabetic dermadrome

References 

Skin conditions resulting from errors in metabolism

No Treatment for this Disease if you found problem any solution then contact wiki